Lamplugh Island is an ice-capped island,  long, lying  north of Whitmer Peninsula, along the coast of Victoria Land, Antarctica. This feature was first sighted by the British National Antarctic Expedition, 1901–04, led by Robert Falcon Scott, but it was first charted as an island by the British Antarctic Expedition, 1907–09 under Ernest Shackleton. It was named by Shackleton for G.W. Lamplugh, who gave assistance to the expedition.

See also 
 List of antarctic and sub-antarctic islands
 Cape Irizar

References

Islands of Victoria Land
Scott Coast